Abdourahmane N'Diaye may refer to:
Abdourahmane N'Diaye (basketball) (born 1953), Senegalese basketball player
Abdourahmane Ndiaye (footballer) (born 1996), Senegalese footballer